Qixingjie Town is an urban town in Lianyuan, Hunan Province, People's Republic of China.

Administrative division
The town is divided into 58 villages and 2 communities, the following areas: 

  Qihu Community
  Hongyuan Community
  Qixing Village
  Tongfang Village
  Honglian Village
  Fuli Village
  Baiyao Village
  Fuxing Village
  Ganxi Village
  Hongqi Village
  Xiashan Village
  Xinmin Village
  Yanjing Village
  Xianshan Village
  Xianglushan Village
  Heishuitang Village
  Luobodang Village
  Dongtang Village
  Jinjing Village
  Laotang Village
  Longgui Village
  Longju Village
  Hongxian Village
  Lixi Village
  Huxi Village
  Shixi Village
  Tielu Village
  Tanshan Village
  Yanzhu Village
  Shizhu Village
  Xiangbo Village
  Sanjiao Village
  Wujia Village
  Qingming Village
  Tongxin Village
  Quxi Village
  Lanma Village
  Hengjie Village
  Rucao Village
  Ruguang Village
  Yatang Village
  Gaoyan Village
  Huangzhu Village
  Baiyang Village
  Tianhu Village
  Ganzhuang Village
  Damu Village
  Dongyuan Village
  Xiandong Village
  Zengjia Village
  Chahua Village
  Dongyan Village
  Caihua Village
  Tuzhu Village
  Zhengli Village
  Lixi Village
  Lishu Village
  Leiming Village
  Nan'an Village
  Chaoguang Village

External links

Divisions of Lianyuan